The planalto woodcreeper (Dendrocolaptes platyrostris) is a species of bird in the subfamily Dendrocolaptinae. It is found across eastern Brazil, Paraguay and far north-eastern Argentina. Its natural habitats are subtropical or tropical moist lowland forests and subtropical or tropical moist montane forest.

References

planalto woodcreeper
Birds of Brazil
Birds of Paraguay
planalto woodcreeper
Taxonomy articles created by Polbot